Peter Nicks is an American filmmaker.

Peter Olivera Nicks (born May 2, 1968) is an American film director, producer and writer. He began his career in television and served as co-producer and editor of the 2006 episode "Blame Somebody Else" of  PBS series AIR: America's Investigative Reports. The episode received an Emmy Award in 2007 for Outstanding Feature Story in a News Magazine, for its exposure of the pipeline of illegal labor human trafficking during the Iraq War. 

He directed the 2012 documentary film The Waiting Room. It follows the life and times of patients, doctors, and staff at Highland Hospital, a safety-net hospital in Oakland, California. 

In 2015 Nicks received a United States Artists (USA) fellowship. 

In 2017 he released The Force (2017 film), a documentary about reform measures at the Oakland Police Department.

In January 2021 the third in his planned trilogy about Oakland public institutions, Homeroom (2021 film), received its world premiere at the online Sundance Film Festival. The film is a documentary following the Oakland High School class of 2020 through their senior year. The 2019-2020 year started normally, with students focusing on education as well as activism for social justice. But it took an unexpected turn when the Covid-19 pandemic forced the students into isolation, with virtual classes and no graduation ceremony.

Nicks next directed Stephen Curry: Underrated, which premiered at the 2023 Sundance Film Festival.

References

External links

Open'hood

Living people
American documentary filmmakers
Year of birth missing (living people)
Sundance Film Festival award winners